In S v Ingram, an important case in South African criminal law, the appellant was a 25-year-old first offender who had stabbed the deceased once, in the heart. He expressed genuine remorse for his conduct. His sentence was altered on appeal to five years' imprisonment in terms of section 276(1)(i) of the Criminal Procedure Act.

See also 
 South African criminal law

References 
 S v Ingram 1999 (2) SACR 127 (W).

Notes 

1999 in South African law
1999 in case law
South African criminal case law